Contemporary Education Dialogue is an open forum to sustain a critical engagement with issues in education. This journal nurtures the discipline and promotes inter-disciplinary perspectives.

It is published twice a year by SAGE Publications in association with Education Dialogue Trust.

Abstracting and indexing 
Contemporary Education Dialogue is abstracted and indexed in:
 Education Resources Information Center
 DeepDyve
 Portico
 EBSCO
 ICI
 J-Gate

External links
 
 Homepage

SAGE Publishing academic journals
Education journals
Publications established in 2003